Wayne MacGregor may refer to:

Wayne MacGregor, character in The Alligator People
Wayne McGregor, choreographer